Walter Penn Shipley (June 20, 1860 – February 17, 1942) was an American lawyer, chess player and chess organizer.

Biography
Shipley graduated from Haverford College, and from the law school at the University of Pennsylvania. He lived and practiced law in Philadelphia.

He was a key chess organizer and promoter at the club, local, state and national levels for much of his life. Shipley was champion of many American tournaments as a player in the late 19th century. He was also a correspondence chess enthusiast. He was a mainstay at the Franklin Mercantile Chess Club in Philadelphia, the nation's second-oldest chess club, and represented the club in many matches.

Shipley became a partner in his own law firm by his late 20s, and practiced law until his retirement in 1927. He died at Philadelphia in 1942, age 81.

Shipley was a lifelong Quaker.

His professional, personal and chess papers are held by the University of Delaware library.

Shipley is the subject of a thorough 2003 biography by John Hilbert, which includes a large selection of his chess games.

Further reading
 Walter Penn Shipley: Philadelphia's Friend of Chess, by John S. Hilbert, McFarland and Company, 2003, .

References

External links
 

American chess players
Haverford College alumni
Lawyers from Philadelphia
University of Pennsylvania Law School alumni
1860 births
1942 deaths
19th-century American lawyers
20th-century American lawyers
19th-century Quakers
20th-century Quakers
American Quakers